Roman Babowal (September 2, 1950, Liege - June 15, 2005, Liege) was a Ukrainian and French poet and translator from Belgium. He was a member of the New York Group. He wrote his works in Ukrainian and French.

References 

1950 births
2005 deaths
American poets in French
Old University of Leuven alumni
Ukrainian poets
Ukrainian translators
Belgian poets
Belgian translators